Rhododendron rex (大王杜鹃), the king rhododendron, is a tree species, usually  in height, in the family Ericaceae. It is found in China, India, and Myanmar, where it is threatened by habitat loss. The flowers are creamy-white, or pale yellow to pink, with a crimson basal blotch. The leaves are 17–27 cm in length and are covered on the underside with an indumentum that ranges in colour from greyish to rusty brown.

The Royal Horticultural Society describes Rhododendron rex and its subspecies as very large shrubs or trees, reaching  in cultivation. Three of them have received the RHS Award of Garden Merit:-
Rhododendron rex 
Rhododendron rex subsp. fictolacteum 
 Rhododendron rex subsp. rex

There is a further named subspecies, Rhododendron rex subsp. gratum.

References

External links

 H. Léveillé, Repert. Spec. Nov. Regni Veg. 13: 340. 1914.
 Danish Chapter of ARS

rex
Near threatened plants
Taxonomy articles created by Polbot